The Minto is the name of a lava flow located in Yukon that was erupted during the Holocene period in the Fort Selkirk Volcanic Field of the Northern Cordilleran Volcanic Province.

See also
List of volcanoes in Canada
List of Northern Cordilleran volcanoes
Volcanism of Canada
Volcanism of Northern Canada
Northern Cordilleran Volcanic Province

References

Volcanism of Yukon
Lava flows